Somchai Makmool (born 17 November 1980) is a Thai football manager He is the current head coach of Thai League 2 club  Krabi.

Managerial statistics

Honours
Sukhothai FC
2016 Thai FA Cup Winners : 2016

References

External links
https://th.soccerway.com/coaches/somchai-makmoon/463022/
https://www.footballdatabase.eu/en/player/details/279195-somchai-makmoon

Living people
1980 births
Somchai Makmool
Somchai Makmool